Andrzej Tadeusz Mazurkiewicz (born 11 May 1963 in Jarosław; died 21 March 2008 in Warsaw) was a Polish politician.

He was an MP for the first independent government between 1991 and 1993, and later a three-time senator (1997–2001 and 2005–2008). He was also the vice-mayor of his hometown Jarosław from 1994 till 1997.

References

1963 births
2008 deaths
Law and Justice politicians
Members of the Polish Sejm 1991–1993
Members of the Senate of Poland 1997–2001
Members of the Senate of Poland 2005–2007
Members of the Senate of Poland 2007–2011
Polish anti-communists
Polish dissidents
Polish Roman Catholics
Roman Catholic activists
Solidarity (Polish trade union) activists
Politicians of Catholic political parties